Eugene Alan Snisky (born January 14, 1970) is an American actor and retired professional wrestler, better known by his ring name Gene Snitsky, who is best known for his time spent with World Wrestling Entertainment. He played college football at the University of Missouri and was on the pre-season roster in 1995 for the Birmingham Barracudas of the Canadian Football League.

Early life
Snitsky attended Panther Valley High School where he played football. While in high school, Snitsky played as a punter. During his senior year, he was named All-State. Upon graduating in 1988, Snitsky signed a full scholarship to the University of Missouri where he played under offensive lineman coach and future Kansas City Chiefs Head Coach Andy Reid. After playing for the Missouri Tigers, Snitsky attended training camps with the goal of playing professional football. He eventually signed with the San Diego Chargers. During training, Snitsky re-aggravated a shoulder injury that was previously misdiagnosed from his college years. The injury effectively ended his NFL aspirations.

Professional wrestling career

Early career
Snisky trained with the Allentown, Pennsylvania-based World Xtreme Wrestling (WXW) and competed in the promotion under the name "Mean" Gene Snitsky. He won the tag-team championship along with his partner Robb Harper as the Twin Tackles, under a football gimmick. When he entered singles competition, he won the WXW Heavyweight Championship. In 2013, Snitsky was inducted into the WXW Hall of Fame.

World Wrestling Entertainment

Developmental territories (2003–2004) 
Snisky had a tryout match with the World Wrestling Entertainment (WWE) the day after winning the WXW Championship on October 20, 2003 in Wilkes-Barre, Pennsylvania at a Raw taping. Snisky, wrestling as Gene Snitsky, was defeated by fellow WXW wrestler "Smooth" Tommy Suede. It was following this match that he was signed to a developmental deal and sent to Ohio Valley Wrestling (OVW). Snisky wrestled in OVW as "Mean" Gene Mondo (a name inspired by "Mean" Gene Okerlund), the brother of Mike Mondo.

Debut and Heat mainstay (2004–2006)
He made his WWE debut on the September 13, 2004 edition of Raw against Kane in a no-disqualification match. As Kane, a heel at the time, prepared to injure Snitsky, he was distracted by Lita, who was (kayfabe) pregnant with Kane's child. Snitsky would use the distraction to hit Kane from behind with the chair, causing Kane to fall on Lita, and causing Lita to miscarry her unborn baby. When interviewed about the incident, Snitsky vehemently claimed that "It Wasn't My Fault" (which would go on to become the character's catchphrase). This facilitated a face turn for Kane and would have Snitsky quickly establish himself as a full-time heel wrestler.

Snitsky, who had debuted against Kane as an apparent jobber, would reveal years later that he was originally only supposed to make a one-night appearance, then return for OVW for more training before being called back up to the main roster on a full-time basis. However, the angle with Kane and Lita had gone over so well that WWE made a last-minute decision to promote Snitsky to the main roster full-time and had to fly Snitsky in on the company's corporate jet just to get to Raw on time.

He was then situated in a major feud with Kane, which led to a match at Taboo Tuesday. In this match, Snitsky used a steel chair and crushed Kane's larynx. WWE used this angle as an excuse for Kane's absence, when in reality he was going to film the WWE-produced movie See No Evil. This feud resumed at the New Year's Revolution pay-per-view, when Kane returned and defeated Snitsky. On the January 31 edition of Raw, Snitsky lost a steel cage match to Kane to end the feud.

At Survivor Series, Snitsky had an encounter with a character similar to his own, Heidenreich, in which they both exchanged their views on each other – "I like .. your poetry."; "I .. like what you do.. to babies." — while breathing hard, both their trademark ways of talking. Snitsky was then in the main event that he was on Team Triple H vs Team Orton during the match he was busted open by Maven he was then disqualified for attacking Maven with a steel chair. At the 2005 Royal Rumble, the two met up again as Snitsky secretly partnered with Heidenreich, planning to interfere in Heidenreich's casket match with The Undertaker. It was later revealed that Kane was hidden in the casket, who pounced on both Snitsky and Heidenreich. They continued their fight in the crowd, before letting the casket match continue. Later that night, Snitsky competed in the Royal Rumble match in which he eliminated Paul London, before being eliminated himself by Batista.

When his rivalry with Kane ended, Snitsky had a shot at the Intercontinental Championship, which then was held by Shelton Benjamin. Snitsky lost by disqualification after hitting Benjamin with a steel chair.

He was absent from WWE television between April and May 2005 due to a blood clot in his stomach. He returned to action on May 28, and reappeared on Raw on May 30, where he began in earnest his televised feud with house show opponent Chris Benoit. The feud concerned Benoit's appearance at ECW One Night Stand; Snitsky was a "hired gun" for Eric Bischoff's Raw volunteers, brought in to try to invade the pay-per-view and ruin the ECW reunion.

Snitsky was then used by Edge and Lita to attack Kane and by Eric Bischoff as punishment to anybody that he did not like. On July 11 episode of Raw, Edge informed Snitsky that he knew about his female foot fetish and offered Snitsky to "have a go with Lita's feet" if he'd help him in a match against Kane. When Lita really thanked Snitsky for his actions nine months earlier, stating that she was better off for not having given birth to Kane's offspring, and then gave him a kiss as payment, their history was addressed.

On the July 18 episode of Raw, Snitsky faced WWE Champion John Cena in the Lumberjack match where Chris Jericho picked all heel lumberjacks to make the odds unfair for Cena.

After a few weeks mainly wrestling on Heat, Snitsky formed a tag team with an initially reluctant Tyson Tomko. In their first team match together, the pair squashed the tag team of Viscera and Val Venis. The pair would have some success as a tag team, earning the number one contenders spot for the World Tag Team Championship at one point. The pair were unable to win the titles from Big Show and Kane, both of whom Snitsky had feuded with in the past. The team was broken up in April 2006 when Tomko left WWE.

Following that, Snitsky turned face and formed a tag team with Goldust, defeating various teams of wrestlers on Heat, which eventually earned them an unsuccessful title shot against Spirit Squad. However, this team was also broken up when Goldust was released from WWE.

Brand switches and departure (2007–2008)

In 2007, Snitsky's character underwent a drastic overhaul and was now portrayed as a psychotic madman with a grotesque appearance. To this effect, all of the hair on Snitsky's head and face was shaved off (including his eyebrows), his teeth were colored a dark yellow, and several red marks were placed on his face. On the February 6, 2007 edition of ECW on Sci Fi, a vignette introduced the newly changed Snitsky to the viewers and announced him coming to ECW. Later during the same show, Snitsky debuted and assaulted the ECW World Champion Bobby Lashley. This re-established him as a monstrous heel, similar to Kane's unmasked gimmick. Over the next several weeks, Snitsky would run into the ring after matches and attack various ECW superstars, including CM Punk, Hardcore Holly Balls Mahoney, and Matt Striker.

On April 3, 2007, Snitsky faced Holly in a match, which he won. After the match, Snitsky wedged Holly's arm in between two steel steps and repeatedly hit the steps with a steel chair, in storyline, breaking Holly's arm. Snitsky then began a short feud with Balls Mahoney. Then, he would begin another short feud with Rob Van Dam. During this feud, Snitsky would suffer his first ECW loss when he was defeated by Van Dam by disqualification.

On the June 11 edition of Raw, Snitsky was drafted from ECW back to Raw as part of the WWE Draft. Snitsky made his return to the brand on the July 9 edition of Raw, defeating Super Crazy.

Snitsky continued to go undefeated on Raw throughout the summer, having pinfall victories over various wrestlers including Super Crazy, Val Venis, Rory McAllister, and Robbie McAllister.

On August 20, Snitsky competed in his first one-on-one main-event match since losing to John Cena on Raw in 2005, once again against Cena, which he lost via disqualification when Randy Orton interfered. This was Snitsky's first loss since returning to the Raw brand. On the September 10 Raw, it was revealed that Snitsky was not Vince McMahon's illegitimate son. Snitsky returned on the October 8 Raw, defeating Val Venis, substituting for Santino Marella, who was feuding with Venis. On December 3, Snitsky was pinned by Jeff Hardy in an Intercontinental Championship match, his first pinfall loss in the year. Snitsky last appeared on WWE television on the November 24, 2008 Raw, losing an Intercontinental Championship tournament match to CM Punk. On December 11, 2008, at his request, Snitsky was released from his WWE contract.

Independent circuit and retirement (2008–2018)
After his release, Snitsky worked in the independent circuit, mainly in World Xtreme Wrestling, where he won the WXW C4 Ultimate Heavyweight Championship on April 20, 2012. He vacated the title on November 3, 2012. On November 4, 2017, Snitsky won the Right Coast Pro Heavyweight Championship in Delaware-based promotion Right Coast Pro Wrestling. However on May 19, 2018, he relinquished the title due to injury. On June 22, 2018, Snitsky announced that he plans to retire from professional wrestling after working a few more shows.

Total Nonstop Action Wrestling (2014)
Snitsky, along with Rycklon, debuted for Total Nonstop Action Wrestling on the June 25 taping of Impact Wrestling (which aired on July 24) as a heel, attacking Tommy Dreamer, Bully Ray and Devon, ostensibly aligning with Dixie Carter.

Snitsky and Rycklon were fired by Carter on the August 7, 2014 edition of Impact Wrestling. Earlier on the show they were in an Eight-Man Hardcore War as Team Dixie (EC3, Rhino, Rycklon and Snitsky) lost to Team Bully (Bully Ray, Devon, Tommy Dreamer and Al Snow).

Other media
In 2009, Gene Snitsky appeared as a biker in the music video for the song "Free Your Soul" by Vyrus. He also appeared as an actor in the role of a biker and a criminal on ABC's Primetime: What Would You Do?, in February 2011. He has appeared in other episodes, including one where he played a person harassing a little person. In 2014, he played a role in a non-profit Mighty Morphin Power Rangers fan film titled MMPR.

Snitsky became a pitchman for Tristar Products' Power Pressure Cooker XL and has shot a series of videos for YouTube where he demonstrates how to prepare various foods in the pressure cooker. Two examples of these are a low country boil and buffalo wings.

Snitsky starred in the 2016 horror film 100 Acres of Hell as Buck Severs.

Personal life
Snitsky lives with his wife in Orwigsburg, Pennsylvania, where they often spend time outdoors. He has a father who served in the Air Force and a brother who served in the Army. After his release from WWE, Snitsky began running an Army surplus store in Hamburg, Pennsylvania, where he also spends time riding bike trails.

Filmography

Video games
Snitsky has also made several appearances in WWE video games, including WWE Day of Reckoning 2, WWE Smackdown! vs. Raw 2006, WWE Smackdown! vs. Raw 2007, WWE SmackDown vs. Raw 2008 and WWE Smackdown vs. Raw 2009.

Championships and accomplishments
Athletik Club Wrestling
ACW Tag Team Championship (1 time) – with Robb Harper
Lancaster Championship Wrestling
LCW Heavyweight Championship (1 time)
Pro Wrestling Illustrated
Ranked No. 83 of the top 500 singles wrestlers in the PWI 500 in 2005
Right Coast Pro
RCP Heavyweight Championship (1 time)
World Xtreme Wrestling
WXW Ultimate Heavyweight Championship (1 time)
WXW Heavyweight Championship (1 time)
WXW Tag Team Championship (1 time) – with Robb Harper
WXW Hall of Fame (class of 2013)

References

External links

1970 births
American male professional wrestlers
Living people
People from Carbon County, Pennsylvania
Professional wrestlers from Pennsylvania
Missouri Tigers football players
Players of American football from Pennsylvania
American football offensive tackles
21st-century professional wrestlers